Black Flag is the eleventh studio album by Hungarian heavy metal band Ektomorf, released in 2012 via AFM Records.

Track listing
"War Is My Way" - 5:11
"Unscarred" - 4:07
"The Cross" - 3:57
"Cut It Out" - 3:40
"Black Flag" - 4:04
"Private Hell" - 3:40
"12 Angels" - 1:57
"Enemy" - 2:09
"Fuck Your God" - 2:49
"Never Surrender" - 2:56
"Sick Love" - 3:27
"Feel Like This" - 3:01
"Kill It" - 3:51
"The Pretender" (Foo Fighters cover) - 4:27

Personnel
Zoltán Farkas - vocals, guitar
Róbert Jaksa - drums
Szabolcs Murvai - bass

External links
Black Flag at AllMusic

2012 albums
Ektomorf albums
AFM Records albums
Albums produced by Tue Madsen